is a railway station on the Keisei Main Line in the city of Ichikawa, Chiba, Japan, operated by the private railway operator Keisei Electric Railway. The station is located near Motoyawata Station on the Toei Shinjuku Line.

Lines

Layout
The station consists of a single island platform connected via a footbridge to an elevated station building.

Platforms

History
The original Yawata Station was located towards Onigoe Station and was closed on 15 August 1942. The station was renamed to its present name on 1 November 1942. Ichikawa Keisei Department Store opened at the station in 1963.The store closed in 2007 as part of the JR Motoyawata Station re-development project.

Station numbering was introduced to all Keisei Line stations on 17 July 2010. Keisei Yawata was assigned station number KS16.

Passenger statistics
In fiscal 2019, the station was used by an average of 36,364 passengers daily.

Surrounding area
 Moto-Yawata Station ( Toei Shinjuku Line)
 Showa Gakuin Junior College
 Fuji Girls' High School

See also
 List of railway stations in Japan

References

External links

 Keisei Station information 

Railway stations in Japan opened in 1915
Railway stations in Chiba Prefecture
Keisei Main Line
Ichikawa, Chiba